Ngāpipi Rēweti (1883–1957) was a land negotiator of the New Zealand Māori iwi (tribe) of Ngāti Whātua. He was born in Okahu Bay, Auckland, New Zealand in about 1883.

References

1883 births
1957 deaths
People from Auckland
Ngāti Whātua people